This is Your Laugh was an Australian television talk show broadcast by 7HD. It was the second Australian television program to be produced exclusively for an HDTV multichannel, the first being The NightCap. The show began broadcasting on 30 November 2008 on Sunday evenings at 8.30pm, where it aired for nine episodes. It returned on 8.30 Saturday 14 February where another two episodes aired, after which it was moved to a late night timeslot on Tuesday's where the last five episodes of the series aired.

Synopsis
The show was hosted by Deal or No Deal and Weekend Sunrise host Andrew O'Keefe who interviews two celebrities who talk about their achievements and their experiences. Some of these experiences are then reenacted comically by a cast of improvisational actors that includes Nicola Parry, Rebecca De Unamuno, Toby Truslove and Daniel Cordeaux. Musician Gep Blake provides music and sound effects.
The program's producer was TV comedy veteran Marc Gracie.

Episode list
The table below shows the guests of each of the series' sixteen episodes.

References

2008 Australian television series debuts
2009 Australian television series endings
7HD original programming
Australian television talk shows
High-definition television